Ranunculus oz is a species of flowering plant in the family Ranunculaceae, native to all of Australia except the Northern Territory. Its specific epithet is a colloquialism for Australia.

References

oz
Endemic flora of Australia
Plants described in 2018